Phoenix Hagen is a German professional basketball club that is based in Hagen, Germany.

After withdrawing from the Basketball Bundesliga in November 2016, Phoenix Hagen re-launched its basketball team for the 2017-18 ProA season. The ProA is Germany's second division of professional basketball.

History
The club was founded in May 2004 in the wake of the insolvency of former top club Brandt Hagen. Brandt Hagen was forced to cease club operation in the Basketball Bundesliga (BBL) immediately in December 2003. Phoenix Hagen is not the legal successor of Brandt Hagen, but an independent new club founded to continue the basketball tradition in Hagen.
Phoenix Hagen was playing in the PRO A division of the German second basketball league until the 2008–09 season. The club rented the license for operating in this league from BG DEK/Fichte Hagen, and thus is that club's legal successor. In the 2008–09 season of the Pro A Phoenix Hagen secured the second place. This position qualified the team for promotion to BBL in the season 2009–10.

Starting with season 2008–09 a Phoenix Hagen women's team is playing in the second women's league DBBL. This team is run in collaboration with the sports club TSV Hagen 1860, from which all players originate.

Phoenix Hagen wants to promote young basketball talents to ensure high-performance sport for the long term. The young talents team Phoenix Hagen Juniors plays in the north-west division of the first league for Germany's up-and-coming players (NBBL). In the first season of existence of the NBBL (2007–08), the Phoenix juniors team became vice champions.

The club filed for insolvency in October 2016 due to financial difficulties and had its Bundesliga license revoked with immediate effect the following month. The club did not finish the 2016–17 season and was placed back to the ProA for the following season.

Licence and arena issue
The home arena "Ischelandhalle" has a capacity of 1,800. The minimum capacity requirement for the BBL is 3,000. A refurbishment and enlargement to a capacity of 3,000 of the current building is planned for the 2009–10 season. Therefore, an alternative location is required for that period. Three options were considered by Phoenix Hagen: a tent solution in Hagen with a capacity of 3,500, an alternative gym in Hagen or a location near Hagen. On 23 April 2009 the BBL refused the application of Phoenix Hagen for a license to play in the BBL. In the application the tent solution was proposed, which has been the reason for the rejection. Within a week after the rejection Phoenix Hagen had the right to appeal against the decision. Phoenix Hagen evaluated the feasibility of converting a building, which is located in Hagen and is currently hosting badminton and tennis courts. As an alternative solution outside of Hagen, the gym "Uni Sporthalle" of the University of Wuppertal was considered. The appeal to the BBL was staged with the plans and contracts for the Hagen solution. On Tuesday 02/05/09 the responsible board of the BBL decided to send a delegation to the proposed location in Hagen to inspect the site before making a final decision on the licence. On Friday 08/05/09 the BBL canceled their previous decision and granted a licence with resolutive condition. Phoenix Hagen is eligible to maintain the licence, if progress requirements for the setup of the basketball arena will be fulfilled. The temporary arena is planned to have a capacity of 3,035. On Monday 06/07/09 the BBL announced that Phoenix Hagen has fulfilled the requirements regarding its economic performance. Phoenix Hagen will have to present the arena converted and ready for match operation by 31 July 2009, which forms the final hurdle towards the 2009–10 BBL licence. In the 08/05/09 press release the BBL already stated that it expects Phoenix Hagen also to meet these requirements.

In November 2016, the club had its Bundesliga license revoked.

Beginning in the 2017–18 season, Phoenix Hagen re-launched its basketball team in the ProA, Germany's second division of professional basketball.

Players

Current roster

Notable former players
- Set a club record or won an individual award as a professional player.
- Played at least one official international match for his senior national team at any time.

-*elected as Phoenix Hagen's "Team of the Century" by the German Newspaper WAZ in January 2020.

Season by season

Kit

Manufacturer
2015: Owayo

Sponsor
2014–2016: Märkische Bank

References

External links
Feuervogel TV  -Live broadcasts and archive of Phoenix Hagen home matches (started Sept. 2008)
Pro A official site 
NBBL official site 
DBBL official site
Presentation at Facebook

Basketball teams established in 2004
Sport in Hagen
Basketball clubs in North Rhine-Westphalia
2004 establishments in Germany